Two British naturalists, John Bradbury and Thomas Nuttall, accompany the Astor Expedition as far as South and North Dakota. Nuttall later writes an account of the birds seen in  Manual of the Ornithology of the United States and of Canada 1832.
Johann Karl Wilhelm Illiger overhauls the Linnean system in Prodromus systematis mammalium et avium
Peter Simon Pallas publishes Zoographia rosso-asiatica in Saint Petersburg.In this work he describes new birds from the Eastern Palaearctic. Examples include Asian brown flycatcher, long-billed murrelet,  spectacled cormorant, hill pigeon, Steller's sea eagle, Caspian gull and white-naped crane.
Bechstein inadequately describes a  bird he calls Lanius gularis in an obscure work titled  General Synopsis of Birds . This is later thought to be the large woodshrike and the name causes some taxonomic problems. Such situations are not uncommon due to problems with language, library insufficiency, short descriptions and the profusion of bird names published in this century.

Birding and ornithology by year
1811 in science